"Don't Waste It on the Blues" is a song written by Jerry Vandiver and Sandy Ramos, and recorded by American country music artist Gene Watson.  It was released in November 1988 as the first single from the album Back in the Fire.  The song reached #5 on the Billboard Hot Country Singles & Tracks chart.

Chart performance

Year-end charts

References

1988 songs
Gene Watson songs
Warner Records singles
Songs written by Jerry Vandiver
Song recordings produced by Paul Worley
1988 singles